Stadion Pod Racinom is a multi-use stadium in Plav, Montenegro. It is currently used mostly for football matches and is the home ground of FK Jezero.

History
The first football stadium in Plav was built in 1948, when FK Jezero was founded. Until the start of the nineties, the pitch had poor infrastructure. After that, the main stand was built  with an overall capacity of 6,000 standing places.
New renovation came after FK Jezero gained promotion to Montenegrin First League, when capacity was reduced to 2,500 seats.

Pitch and conditions
The pitch measures 105 x 70 meters. The stadium meet criteria for Prva CFL games.

Trivia
The highest attendance was recorded on local derby FK Jezero - FK Gusinje in 1999. That game was attended by 7,000 spectators,  but many of them were on a nearby hill, not on the stands. That was one of the highest-ever attendance on the single game of the Montenegrin Republic League.

See also
FK Jezero 
Plav 
Lake Plav 
Montenegrin Second League

External links
Stadium information

References 

Multi-purpose stadiums in Montenegro
Football venues in Montenegro
Football in Montenegro
Plav, Montenegro